Rachel Amanda Friend (born 8 January 1970) is an Australian actress and journalist.

Career
Friend joined the cast of the soap opera Neighbours in 1988, when she was eighteen. Friend chose to postpone her university degree to join the show as Bronwyn Davies. Friend quit Neighbours in 1990. That same year saw her win the Logie Award for "Most Popular Actress".

Other roles include Frog Dreaming (1986) and Golden Fiddles (1991). She had a brief appearance in Round The Twist as a Mermaid. Friend hosted the Seven Network show Saturday Kitchen with her husband Stuart MacGill on Saturday afternoons. In 2003, Friend established her own PR company, Media Friendly, and as of July 2007, is producing and presenting the Seven Network's new parenting show, Mums and Bubs. In 2009, Friend began hosting a television show on the Seven Network called New Idea TV alongside Barbara Northwood, Tom Williams and a variety of other presenters.

Personal life
In 1993, Friend married Australian actor-singer Craig McLachlan whom she had met on the set of Neighbours. They divorced the following year.

Friend married Australian cricketer Stuart MacGill in 2000 and they have two children together. The pair separated in 2013.

References

External links
MediaFriendly website

1970 births
Australian film actresses
Australian soap opera actresses
Living people
Logie Award winners
Place of birth missing (living people)